Theodore Aloysius "Theo" Huxtable is a fictional character who appears in the American sitcom The Cosby Show, portrayed by actor Malcolm-Jamal Warner.

Conception

Theo Huxtable was based on Bill Cosby's only son Ennis Cosby. He also gave the character dyslexia as his son also had the condition. Theo's disability is revealed in episode "Theo's Gift".

Role

Theo Huxtable was the middle child. Theo is the only son of Cliff and Clair Huxtable

Reception

Theo Huxtable has had a mostly positive reception from viewers. The character also won praise about discussing dyslexia. Warner was nominated for the Primetime Emmy Award for Outstanding Supporting Actor in a Comedy Series in 1986, making him the youngest nominee in history in that category.

References

Television characters introduced in 1984
Fictional African-American people
The Cosby Show characters
Fictional characters from Brooklyn
Child characters in television
Fictional characters with dyslexia
Fictional college students
Teenage characters in television